Huelva Cathedral is a Roman Catholic church located in Huelva, Andalusia, Spain. It was affiliated with the adjacent former convent of La Merced.

History
The convent church from the 17th century was destroyed by several earthquakes in the 18th century. A church rebuilt in 1775 in Neoclassical style. The church was declared a National Monument in 1970, and was elevated to the status of a cathedral in 1953.

References

18th-century Roman Catholic church buildings in Spain
Neoclassical architecture in Andalusia
Huelva
Churches in Andalusia
Roman Catholic churches completed in 1775
Neoclassical church buildings in Spain